Černochov is a village and municipality in the Trebišov District in the Košice Region of south-eastern Slovakia.

History
In historical records the village was first mentioned in 1298.

Geography
The village lies at an altitude of 175 metres and covers an area of 6.156 km².
It has a population of 215 people.

Ethnicity
The village is about 78% Hungarian and 22% Slovak in ethnic origin.

Facilities
The village has a public library and a football pitch.

Genealogical resources

The records for genealogical research are available at the state archive "Statny Archiv in Kosice, Slovakia"

 Reformated church records (births/marriages/deaths): 1854–1934 (parish A)

See also
 List of municipalities and towns in Slovakia

External links
http://www.statistics.sk/mosmis/eng/run.html
Surnames of living people in Cernochov

Villages and municipalities in Trebišov District
Zemplín (region)